Two ships of the Royal Navy have borne the name HMS Cotswold:

  was a  minesweeper launched in 1916 and sold in 1923 for scrapping. 
  was a  launched in 1940 and sold in 1957 for scrapping.

Royal Navy ship names